The 1968 Campeonato Nacional de Futbol Profesional was Chilean first tier’s 36th season. Santiago Wanderers were the champions, winning its second title.

First stage

Torneo Metropolitano

5th-place play-off

Torneo Provincial

5th-place play-off

Second stage

Torneo Promocional

Final stage

Torneo Nacional

Serie A

Serie B

Title

Pre-Copa Libertadores play-off

Universidad Católica also qualified for the 1969 Copa Libertadores due to better goal difference in the Final stage

Top goalscorers

Sources
RSSSF Chile 1968
Tablas 1968

External links
ANFP 

Primera División de Chile seasons
Chile
Prim